Killua may refer to:

Places

Ireland 
 Killua Castle, Clonmellon, County Westmeath
 Killua (civil parish), a civil parish in the barony of Delvin, County Westmeath
 Killua, County Westmeath, a townland in the barony of Delvin

Other
 Killua (singer), Albanian singer and songwriter
 Killua Zoldyck, a character from the manga series Hunter × Hunter by Yoshihiro Togashi